Pati Patni Aur Tawaif is a 1990 Indian Hindi-language film directed by Rajkumar Kohli, starring Mithun Chakraborty, Salma Agha, Farha Naaz and Om Prakash. It is a remake of Pakistan's 1988 Urdu language movie Bazar-e-Husn. Salma Agha reprised her role from Bazar-e-Husn in Pati Patni Aur Tawaif.

Plot
Vijay Saxena a well-known actor-director lives with his wife, Shanti, and a child. When his movie actress walks out of his movie, Vijay is introduced to a prostitute named Gauri. Problems arise when Vijay ends up in relationship with Gauri.

Soundtrack
Laxmikant–Pyarelal was the music director of the movie and composed tunes for the songs. All lyrics were written by Anand Bakshi except for Mujhe Log Kehte Hain Kadmon Ki Dhool was co-written with Pyarelal Shrivasta.

Cast

Mithun Chakraborty as Vijay Saxena
Salma Agha as Gauri
Farha Naaz as Mrs. Shanti Saxena
Anita Raj as Kiran
Sumeet Saigal as Prince Kumar
Sonika Gill as Chandni
Gulshan Grover as Advocate
Aruna Irani as Chhaiya
Jagdeep as Ustad
Amjad Khan as Sulaiman Dildar
Roopesh Kumar as Gauri's Uncle (Mama)
Om Prakash as Tarachand

References

External links
 

1990 films
1990s Hindi-language films
Films scored by Laxmikant–Pyarelal
Indian remakes of Pakistani films
Films based on Indian novels